The American Cinema Editors Award for Best Edited Feature Film – Dramatic is one of the annual awards given by the American Cinema Editors, awarded to what members of the American Cinema Editors Guild deem as the best edited dramatic film for a given year.

Before splitting in 2000, this award included both dramatic and comedy/musical films.

Winners and nominees

1960s
Best Edited Feature Film

1970s

1980s

1990s

Best Edited Feature Film – Dramatic

2000s

2010s

2020s

See also
 BAFTA Award for Best Editing
 Academy Award for Best Film Editing
 Independent Spirit Award for Best Editing
 Critics' Choice Movie Award for Best Editing
 American Cinema Editors Award for Best Edited Feature Film – Comedy or Musical

References

External links
 

American Cinema Editors Awards